Matthias I may refer to:
 Matthias I, Duke of Lorraine (1119–1176)
 Matthias Corvinus of Hungary (1443–1490)
 Matthias, Holy Roman Emperor (1557–1619)